Poularies is a municipality in northwestern Quebec, Canada in the Abitibi-Ouest Regional County Municipality. It covers 164.95 km² and had a population of 679 as of the Canada 2011 Census.

The municipality was incorporated on May 7, 1924.

Demographics
Population trend:
 Population in 2011: 679 (2006 to 2011 population change: -2.0%)
 Population in 2006: 693
 Population in 2001: 751
 Population in 1996: 838
 Population in 1991: 835

Private dwellings occupied by usual residents: 272 (total dwellings: 276)

Mother tongue:
 English as first language: 3.6%
 French as first language: 95.0%
 English and French as first language: 0%
 Other as first language: 1.4%

Municipal council
 Mayor: Gino Levesque
 Councillors: Johanne Bolduc, Diane Bouchard, Sophie Dallaire, Solange Maheux, Lucie Noël, Patrick Thiffault

References

Municipalities in Quebec
Incorporated places in Abitibi-Témiscamingue
Populated places established in 1916